Jorge Castillo (born 31 March 1939) is a Mexican rower. He competed in the men's coxed four event at the 1968 Summer Olympics.

References

External links
 

1939 births
Living people
Mexican male rowers
Olympic rowers of Mexico
Rowers at the 1968 Summer Olympics
Rowers from Mexico City